Joachim Johann Nepomuk Anton Spalowsky (1752, Reichenberg – 1797) was an Austrian naturalist and polymath.

"He was a surgeon attached to the civic regiments of Vienna."

Spalowsky's 1795 treatise on conchology, Prodromus in Systema Historicum Testaceorum, published by the widow of Ignaz Alberti, includes original descriptions of several new species. He also wrote works on birds, plants, and mammals, including Beytrag zur Naturgeschichte der Vögel (1790–95).

He was a Member of the Royal Czech Society of Sciences.

References

Alan R Kabat, 1996. J.J.N.A. Spalowsky (1752–97) and the Prodromus in Systema Historicum Testaceorum (1795). Archives of Natural History (1996) 23 (2): 245–54

Conchologists
Czech zoologists
Liberec
1752 births
1797 deaths